John Corey may refer to:

 John Corey (character), lead character in Nelson DeMille's John Corey series
 John Corey (actor), 18th-century English stage actor and playwright

See also
 John Cory (1828–1910), British philanthropist, coal-owner and ship-owner